Lieutenant-General Sir Adrian Paul Ghislain Carton de Wiart,  (5 May 1880 – 5 June 1963) was a British Army officer born of Belgian and Irish parents. He was awarded the Victoria Cross, the highest military decoration awarded for valour "in the face of the enemy" in various Commonwealth countries. He served in the Boer War, First World War, and Second World War. He was shot in the face, head, stomach, ankle, leg, hip, and ear; was blinded in his left eye; survived two plane crashes; tunnelled out of a prisoner-of-war camp; and tore off his own fingers when a doctor declined to amputate them. Describing his experiences in the First World War, he wrote, "Frankly I had enjoyed the war."

After returning home from service (including a period as a prisoner-of-war) in the Second World War, he was sent to China as Winston Churchill's personal representative. While en route he attended the Cairo Conference.

In his memoirs, Carton de Wiart wrote, "Governments may think and say as they like, but force cannot be eliminated, and it is the only real and unanswerable power. We are told that the pen is mightier than the sword, but I know which of these weapons I would choose." Carton de Wiart was thought to be a model for the character of Brigadier Ben Ritchie-Hook in Evelyn Waugh's trilogy Sword of Honour. The Oxford Dictionary of National Biography described him thus: "With his black eyepatch and empty sleeve, Carton de Wiart looked like an elegant pirate, and became a figure of legend."

Early life

Background 
Carton de Wiart was born into an aristocratic family in Brussels, on 5 May 1880, eldest son of Léon Constant Ghislain Carton de Wiart (1854–1915) and Ernestine Wenzig (1860–1886). By his contemporaries, he was widely believed to be an illegitimate son of King Leopold II of the Belgians. He spent his early days in Belgium and in England. The 'loss of his mother' when he was six prompted his father to move the family to Cairo so his father could practise at Egypt's mixed courts. It was widely assumed by biographers that his mother had died in 1886; however, his parents had in fact divorced in that year and his mother remarried Demosthenes Gregory Cuppa later in 1886. His father was a lawyer and magistrate, as well as a director of the Cairo Electric Railways and Heliopolis Oases Company and was well connected in Egyptian governmental circles. Adrian Carton de Wiart learned to speak Arabic.

Carton de Wiart was a Roman Catholic. In 1891, his English stepmother sent him to a boarding school in England, the Roman Catholic Oratory School, founded by John Henry Newman. From there, he went to Balliol College, Oxford, but left to join the British Army at the time of the Second Boer War around 1899, where he entered under the false name of "Trooper Carton", claiming to be 25 years old. His real age was no more than 20.

Second Boer War 
Carton de Wiart was wounded in the stomach and groin in South Africa early in the Second Boer War and was invalided home. His father was furious when he learned his son had abandoned his studies, but allowed his son to remain in the army. After another brief period at Oxford, where Aubrey Herbert was among his friends, he was given a commission in the Second Imperial Light Horse. He saw action in South Africa again, and on 14 September 1901 was given a regular commission as a second lieutenant in the 4th Dragoon Guards. Carton de Wiart was transferred to India in 1902. He enjoyed sports, especially shooting and pig sticking.

Character, interests and life in the Edwardian army
Carton de Wiart's serious wound in the Boer War instilled in him a strong desire for physical fitness and he ran, jogged, walked, and played sports on a regular basis. In male company he was "a delightful character and must hold the world record for bad language."

After his regiment was transferred to South Africa he was promoted to supernumerary lieutenant on 16 July 1904 and appointed an aide-de-camp to the Commander-in-Chief, Sir Henry Hildyard, the following July. He describes this period lasting up to 1914 as his "Heyday", the title of Chapter 3 of his autobiography. His light duties as aide-de-camp gave him time for polo, another of his interests. By 1907, although Carton de Wiart had now served in the British Army for eight years, he had remained a Belgian subject. On 13 September of that year, he took the oath of allegiance to Edward VII and was formally naturalised as a British subject.

In 1908 he married Countess Friederike Maria Karoline Henriette Rosa Sabina Franziska Fugger von Babenhausen (1887 Klagenfurt – 1949 Vienna), eldest daughter of Karl, 5th Fürst (Prince) von Fugger-Babenhausen and Princess Eleonora zu Hohenlohe-Bartenstein und Jagstberg of Klagenfurt, Austria. They had two daughters, the elder of whom Anita (born 1909, deceased) was the maternal grandmother of the war correspondent Anthony Loyd (born 1966).

Carton de Wiart was already well connected in European circles, his two closest cousins being Count Henri Carton de Wiart, Prime Minister of Belgium from 1920 to 1921, and Baron Edmond Carton de Wiart, political secretary to the King of Belgium and director of La Société Générale de Belgique. While on leave, he travelled extensively throughout central Europe, using his Catholic aristocratic connections to shoot at country estates in Bohemia, Austria, Hungary, and Bavaria. Following his return to England, he rode with the famous Duke of Beaufort's Hunt where he met, among others, the future field marshal, Sir Henry Maitland Wilson, and the future air marshal, Sir Edward Ellington. He was promoted to captain on 26 February 1910. The Duke of Beaufort was the honorary colonel of the Royal Gloucestershire Hussars, and from 1 January 1912 until his departure for Somaliland in 1914 Carton de Wiart served as the regiment's adjutant.

First World War

Somaliland Campaign 
When the First World War broke out, Carton de Wiart was en route to British Somaliland where a low-level war was underway against the followers of Dervish leader Mohammed bin Abdullah, called the "Mad Mullah" by the British. Carton de Wiart had been seconded to the Somaliland Camel Corps. A staff officer with the corps was Hastings Ismay, later Lord Ismay, Churchill's military advisor. In an attack upon an enemy fort at Shimber Berris, Carton de Wiart was shot twice in the face, losing his eye and also a portion of his ear. He was awarded the Distinguished Service Order (DSO) on 15 May 1915.

Western Front 
In February 1915, he embarked on a steamer for France. Carton de Wiart took part in the fighting on the Western Front, commanding successively three infantry battalions and a brigade. He was wounded seven more times in the war, losing his left hand in 1915 and pulling off his fingers when a doctor declined to remove them. He was shot through the skull and ankle at the Battle of the Somme, through the hip at the Battle of Passchendaele, through the leg at Cambrai, and through the ear at Arras. He went to the Sir Douglas Shield's Nursing Home to recover from his injuries.

Victoria Cross
Carton de Wiart received the Victoria Cross (VC), the highest award for gallantry in combat that can be awarded to British Empire forces, in 1916. He was 36 years old, and a temporary lieutenant-colonel in the 4th Dragoon Guards (Royal Irish), British Army, attached to the Gloucestershire Regiment, commanding the 8th Battalion, when the following events took place on 2/3 July 1916 at La Boiselle, France, as recorded in the official citation:

His Victoria Cross is displayed at the National Army Museum, Chelsea.

1916–1918

Carton de Wiart was promoted to temporary major in March 1916. He subsequently attained the rank of temporary lieutenant colonel on 18 July, was brevetted to major on 1 January 1917 and was promoted to temporary brigadier general on 12 January 1917. He was appointed an Officer of the Order of the Crown of Belgium in April 1917. On 3 June 1917, Carton de Wiart was brevetted to lieutenant-colonel. On 18 July, he was promoted to the substantive rank of major in the Dragoon Guards. He was awarded the Belgian Croix de Guerre in March 1918, and was appointed a Companion of the Order of St Michael and St George in the King's Birthday Honours List in June.

Three days before the end of the war, on 8 November, Carton de Wiart was given command of a brigade with the rank of temporary brigadier general. A S Bullock gives a vivid first-hand description of his arrival: 'Cold shivers went down the back of everyone in the brigade, for he had an unsurpassed record as a fire eater, missing no chance of throwing the men under his command into whatever fighting happened to be going.' Bullock recalls how the battalion looked 'very much the worse for wear' when they paraded for the brigadier general's inspection. He arrived 'on a lively cob with his cap tilted at a rakish angle, and a shade over the place where one of his eyes had been'. He was also missing two limbs and had eleven wound stripes. Bullock, the first man in line for the inspection, notes that Carton de Wiart, despite having only one eye, ordered him to get his bootlace changed.

Post First World War era and the Polish mission

At the end of the war Carton de Wiart was sent to Poland as second in command of the British-Poland Military Mission under General Louis Botha. Carton de Wiart was appointed a Companion of the Order of the Bath in the 1919 King's Birthday Honours List. After a brief period, he replaced General Botha in the mission to Poland.

Poland desperately needed support, as it was engaged with Bolshevik Russia in the Polish-Soviet War, the Ukrainians in the Polish-Ukrainian War, the Lithuanians in the Polish-Lithuanian War, and the Czechs in the Czech-Polish border conflicts. There he met Ignacy Jan Paderewski, the pianist and premier, Marshal Józef Piłsudski, the Chief of State and military commander, and General Maxime Weygand, head of the French military mission in mid-1920. One of his tasks soon after his arrival was to attempt to make peace between the Poles and the Ukrainian nationalists under Simon Petlyura. The Ukrainians were besieging the city of Lwów. The discussions were unsuccessful.

From there he went on to Paris to report on Polish conditions to the British Prime Minister, David Lloyd George and to General Sir Henry Wilson. Lloyd George was not sympathetic to Poland and, much to Carton de Wiart's annoyance, Britain sent next to no military supplies. Then he went back to Poland and many more front line adventures, this time in the Bolshevik zone, where the situation was grave and Warsaw threatened. During this time he had significant interaction with the nuntius (dean of the Vatican diplomatic corps) Cardinal Achille Ratti, later Pius XI, who wanted Carton de Wiart's advice as to whether to evacuate the diplomatic corps from Warsaw. The diplomats moved to Poznań, but the Italians remained in Warsaw along with Ratti.

From all these affairs, Carton de Wiart developed a sympathy with the Poles and supported their claims to eastern Galicia. This caused disagreement with Lloyd George at their next meeting, but was appreciated by the Poles. At one time during his Warsaw stay he was a second in a duel between Polish members of the Mysliwski Club, the other second being Baron Carl Gustaf Emil Mannerheim, later commander-in-chief of Finnish armies in World War II and President of Finland. Norman Davies reports that he was "compromised in a gun-running operation from Budapest using stolen wagon-lits".

He became close to the Polish leader, Marshal Piłsudski. After an aircraft crash occasioning a brief period in Lithuanian captivity, he went back to England to report, this time to the Secretary of State for War, Winston Churchill. He passed on to Churchill Piłsudski's prediction that the White Russian offensive under General Anton Denikin directed at Moscow would fail. It did shortly thereafter. Churchill was more sympathetic to Polish needs than Lloyd George and succeeded, over Lloyd George's objections, in sending some materiel to Poland.

On 27 July 1920, Carton de Wiart was appointed an aide-de-camp to the king, and brevetted to colonel. He was active in August 1920, when the Red Army were at the gates of Warsaw. While out on his observation train, he was attacked by a group of Red cavalry, and fought them off with his revolver from the footplate of his train, at one point falling on the track and re-boarding quickly.

When the Poles won the war, the British Military Mission was wound up. Carton de Wiart was promoted to temporary brigadier general and also appointed to the local rank of major general on 1 January. He was promoted to the substantive rank of colonel on 21 June 1922, with seniority from 27 July 1920 and relinquished his local rank of major general on 1 April 1923, going on half-pay as a colonel at the same time. Carton de Wiart officially retired from the army on 19 December, with the honorary rank of major general.

Polish gentleman (1924–1939) 
His last Polish aide de camp was Prince Karol Mikołaj Radziwiłł, member of the Radziwiłł family who inherited a large  estate in eastern Poland when the communists killed his uncle. They became friends and Carton de Wiart was given the use of a large estate called Prostyń, in the Pripet Marshes, a wetland area larger than Ireland and surrounded by water and forests. In this location Carton de Wiart spent the rest of the interwar years. In his memoirs he said "In my fifteen years in the marshes I did not waste one day without hunting".

After 15 years, Carton de Wiart's peaceful Polish life was interrupted by the looming war, when he was recalled in July 1939 and appointed to his old job, as head of the British Military Mission to Poland. Poland was attacked by Nazi Germany on 1 September and on 17 September the Soviets allied with Germany attacked Poland from the east. Soon Soviet forces overran Prostyń and Carton de Wiart lost all his guns, fishing rods, clothing, and furniture. They were packed up by the Soviets and stored in the Minsk Museum, but destroyed by the Germans in later fighting. He never saw the area again, but as he said "they did not manage to take my memories".

Second World War

Polish campaign (1939)
Carton de Wiart met with the Polish commander-in-chief, Marshal of Poland Edward Rydz-Śmigły, in late August 1939 and formed a rather low opinion of his capabilities. He strongly urged Rydz-Śmigły to pull Polish forces back beyond the Vistula River, but was unsuccessful. The other advice he offered, to have the seagoing units of the Polish fleet leave the Baltic Sea, was, after much argument, finally adopted. This fleet made a significant contribution to the Allied cause, especially the several modern destroyers and submarines.

As Polish resistance weakened, Carton de Wiart evacuated his mission from Warsaw along with the Polish government. Together with the Polish commander Rydz-Śmigły, Carton de Wiart made his way with the rest of the British Mission to the Romanian border with both the Germans and the Soviets in pursuit. His car convoy was attacked by the Luftwaffe on the road, and the wife of one of his aides was killed. He was in danger of arrest in Romania and got out by aircraft on 21 September with a false passport, just in time as the pro-Allied Romanian prime minister, Armand Calinescu, was assassinated that day.

Norwegian campaign (1940)

Recalled to a special appointment in the army in the autumn of 1939, Carton de Wiart reverted to his former rank of colonel. He was granted the rank of acting major general on 28 November. After a brief stint in command of the 61st Division in the English Midlands, Carton de Wiart was summoned in April 1940 to take charge of a hastily drawn together Anglo-French force to occupy Namsos, a small town in middle Norway. His orders were to take the city of Trondheim, 125 miles (200 km) to the south, in conjunction with a naval attack and an advance from the south by troops landed at Åndalsnes. He flew to Namsos to reconnoitre the location before the troops arrived. When his Short Sunderland flying boat landed, it was attacked by a German fighter and his aide was wounded and had to be evacuated. After the French Alpine troops landed (without their transport mules and missing straps for their skis), the Luftwaffe bombed and destroyed the town of Namsos.

Despite these handicaps, Carton de Wiart managed to move his forces over the mountains and down to Trondheimsfjord, where they were shelled by German destroyers. They had no artillery to challenge the German ships. It soon became apparent that the whole Norwegian campaign was fast becoming a failure. The naval attack on Trondheim, the reason for the Namsos landing, did not happen and his troops were exposed without guns, transport, air cover, or skis in a foot and a half of snow. They were being attacked by German ski troops, machine gunned and bombed from the air, and the German Navy was landing troops to his rear. He recommended withdrawal but was asked to hold his position for political reasons, which he did.

After orders and counterorders from London, the decision to evacuate was made. However, on the date set to evacuate the troops, the ships did not appear. The next night a naval force finally arrived, led through the fog by Lord Louis Mountbatten. The transports successfully evacuated the entire force amid heavy bombardment by the Germans, resulting in the sinking of two destroyers: the French  and British . Carton de Wiart arrived back at the British naval base of Scapa Flow in the Orkney Islands on 5 May 1940, his 60th birthday.

Northern Ireland
Carton de Wiart was posted back to the command of the 61st Division, which was soon transferred to Northern Ireland as a defence against invasion. However, following the arrival of Lieutenant-General Sir Henry Pownall as Commander-in-Chief in Northern Ireland, Carton de Wiart was told that he was too old to command a division on active duty.

British military mission to Yugoslavia (1941)

Advanced to temporary major-general on 28 November 1940, he remained inactive very briefly, as he was appointed as head of the British-Yugoslavian Military Mission on 5 April 1941. Hitler was preparing to invade the country and the Yugoslavs asked for British help. Carton de Wiart travelled in a Vickers Wellington bomber to Belgrade, Serbia to negotiate with the Yugoslavian government. After refuelling in Malta, the aircraft left for Cairo with enemy territory to the north and south. Both engines failed off the coast of Italian-controlled Libya, and the plane crash-landed in the sea about a mile from land. Carton de Wiart was knocked unconscious, but the cold water made him regain consciousness. When the plane broke up and sank, he and the rest aboard were forced to swim to shore. They were captured by the Italian authorities.

Prisoner of war in Italy (1941–1943)
Carton de Wiart was a high-profile prisoner. After four months at the Villa Orsini at Sulmona, he was transferred to a special prison for senior officers at Castello di Vincigliata. There were a number of senior officer prisoners here due to the successes achieved by Rommel in North Africa early in 1941. Carton de Wiart made friends, especially with General Sir Richard O'Connor, The 6th Earl of Ranfurly and Lieutenant-General Philip Neame, VC.
In letters to his wife, Lord Ranfurly described Carton de Wiart in captivity as "a delightful character" and said he "must hold the record for bad language." Ranfurly was "endlessly amused by him. He really is a nice person – superbly outspoken." The four were committed to escaping. He made five attempts, including seven months tunnelling. Once Carton de Wiart evaded capture for eight days disguised as an Italian peasant (he was in northern Italy, could not speak Italian, and was 62 years old, with an eye patch, one empty sleeve and multiple injuries and scars).

Then, in a surprising development, Carton de Wiart was taken from prison in August 1943 and driven to Rome. The Italian government was secretly planning to leave the war and wanted Carton de Wiart to send the message to the British Army about a peace treaty with the UK. Carton de Wiart was to accompany an Italian negotiator, General , to Lisbon to meet Allied contacts to negotiate the surrender. To keep the mission secret, Carton de Wiart was told he needed civilian clothes. Distrusting Italian tailors, he stated that "[he] had no objection provided [he] did not resemble a gigolo." In Happy Odyssey, he described the resultant suit as being "as good as anything that ever came out of Savile Row." When they reached Lisbon, Carton de Wiart was released and made his way to England, reaching there on 28 August 1943.

China mission (1943–1947)

Within a month of his arrival back in England, Carton de Wiart was summoned to spend a night at the prime minister's country home at Chequers. Churchill informed him that he was to be sent to China as his personal representative. He was granted the rank of acting lieutenant-general on 9 October, and left by air for India on 18 October 1943. Anglo-Chinese relations were difficult in World War II as the Kuomintang had long called for the end of British extraterritorial rights in China together with the return of Hong Kong, neither proposal being welcome to Churchill. In early 1942, Churchill had to ask Chiang Kai-shek to send Chinese troops to help the British hold Burma from the Japanese, and following the Japanese conquest of Burma the X Force of five Chinese divisions had ended up in eastern India. Churchill was unhappy with having the X Force defend India as it weakened the prestige of the Raj, and in an attempt to improve relations with China, the prime minister felt a soldier experienced in diplomacy such as Carton de Wiart would be the best man to be his personal representative in China.

As his accommodation in China was not ready, Carton de Wiart spent time in India gaining an understanding of the situation in China, especially being briefed by a genuine tai-pan, John Keswick, head of the great China trading empire Jardine Matheson. He met the Viceroy, Field Marshal Viscount Wavell and General Sir Claude Auchinleck, the Commander-in-Chief in India. He also met Orde Wingate. Before arriving in China, Carton de Wiart attended the 1943 Cairo Conference organized by Churchill, U.S President Roosevelt and Chinese Generalissimo Chiang Kai-shek.

When in Cairo, he took the opportunity to renew his acquaintance with Hermione, Countess of Ranfurly, the wife of his friend from prisoner-of-war days, Dan Ranfurly. Carton de Wiart was one of the few to be able to work with the notoriously difficult commander of US forces in the China-Burma-India Theatre, U.S Army General Joseph Stilwell. He arrived in the headquarters of the Nationalist Chinese Government, Chungking (Chongqing), in early December 1943. For the next three years, he was to be involved in a host of reporting, diplomatic and administrative duties in the remote wartime capital. Carton de Wiart became a great admirer of the Chinese people. He wrote that, when he was appointed as Churchill's personal representative to Chiang Kai-shek in China, he imagined a country "full of whimsical little people with quaint customs who carved lovely jade ornaments and worshiped their grandmothers." Once stationed in China, however, he wrote: "Two things struck me forcibly: the first was the amount of sheer hard work the people were doing, and the second their cheerfulness in doing it."

He regularly flew out to India to liaise with British officials. His old friend, Richard O'Connor, had escaped from the Italian prisoner-of-war camp and was now in command of British troops in eastern India. The Governor of Bengal, the Australian Richard Casey, became a good friend.

On 9 October 1944, Carton de Wiart was promoted to temporary lieutenant-general and to the war substantive rank of major-general. Carton de Wiart returned home in December 1944 to report to the War Cabinet on the Chinese situation. He was appointed Knight Commander of the Order of the British Empire (KBE) in the 1945 New Year Honours. Clement Attlee, when he became head of the Labour Government in June 1945, asked Carton de Wiart to stay on in China.

South East Asia 
Carton de Wiart was assigned to a tour of the Burma Front, and after meeting Admiral Sir James Somerville, Commander-in-Chief of the British Eastern Fleet, he was given a front seat on the bridge of the battleship  for the bombardment of Sabang in the Netherlands East Indies in 1945, including air battles between Japanese fighters and British carrier aircraft.

A good part of Carton de Wiart's reporting had to do with the increasing power of the Chinese Communists. The journalist and historian Max Hastings writes: "De Wiart despised all Communists on principle, denounced Mao Zedong as 'a fanatic', and added: 'I cannot believe he means business'. He told the British cabinet that there was no conceivable alternative to Chiang as ruler of China." He met Mao Zedong at dinner and had a memorable exchange with him, interrupting his propaganda speech to criticise him for holding back from fighting the Japanese for domestic political reasons. Mao was briefly stunned, and then laughed.

After the Japanese surrender in August 1945, Carton de Wiart flew to Singapore to participate in the formal surrender. After a visit to Peking, he moved to Nanking, the now-liberated Nationalist capital, accompanied by Julian Amery, the British Prime Minister's Personal Representative to Chiang. A visit to Tokyo to meet General Douglas MacArthur came at the end of his tenure. He was now 66 and ready to retire, despite the offer of a job by Chiang. Carton de Wiart retired in October 1947, with the honorary rank of lieutenant-general.

Retirement and death
En route home via French Indochina, Carton de Wiart stopped in Rangoon as a guest of the army commander. Coming down stairs, he slipped on coconut matting, fell down, broke several vertebrae, and knocked himself unconscious. He was admitted to Rangoon Hospital where he was treated. His wife died in 1949. In 1951, at the age of 71, he married Ruth Myrtle Muriel Joan McKechnie, a divorcee known as Joan Sutherland, 23 years his junior (born in late 1903, she died 13 January 2006 at the age of 102.) They settled at Aghinagh House, Killinardrish, County Cork, Ireland.

Carton de Wiart died at the age of 83 on 5 June 1963. He left no papers. He and his wife Joan are buried in Caum Churchyard just off the main Macroom road. The grave site is just outside the actual graveyard wall on the grounds of his own home, Aghinagh House. Carton de Wiart's will was valued at probate in Ireland at £4,158 and in England at £3,496.

Publications
 Happy Odyssey: The Memoirs of Lieutenant-General Sir Adrian Carton de Wiart, Jonathan Cape, 1950.

Awards and decorations
Carton de Wiart was the recipient of several awards:

In popular culture
Carton de Wiart is the subject of the 2022 song "The Unkillable Soldier" by Swedish heavy metal band Sabaton on their album The War to End all Wars.

See also
Jack Churchill, another notably eccentric British officer

References

Sources

Further reading
 Boatner, Mark, (1999), The Biographical Dictionary of World War II, Presidio Press, Novato, California.
 Buzzell, Nora (1997), The Register of the Victoria Cross, This England.
 Davies, Norman, (2003) White Eagle, Red Star: The Polish-Soviet War 1919–1920, Pimlico Edition, London. 
 Davies, Norman, (2003) The Miracle on the Vistula", Pimlico Edition, London.
 Doherty, Richard; Truesdale, David, (2000) Irish Winners of the Victoria Cross
 Foot, M.R.D. & Langley, J.M., MI9 Escape & Evasion 1939–45, The Bodley Head, 1979, 365 pages
 Gliddon, Gerald (1994), VCs of the First World War – The Somme.
 Hargest, Brigadier, James C.B.E., D.S.O. M.C., Farewell Campo 12, Michael Joseph Ltd, 1945, 184 pages contains a sketch map of Castello Vincigliata page 85, route of capture and escape 'Sidi Azir – London (inside front cover),(no index)
 Harvey, David, (1999), Monuments to Courage.
 Leeming, John F (1951) Always To-Morrow, George G Harrap & Co. Ltd, London, 188p, Illustrated with photographs and maps
 Neame, Sir Philip Lt-Gen. V.C., K.B.E., C.B., D.S.O., Playing with Strife, The Autobiography of a Soldier, George G Harrap & Co. Ltd, 1947, 353 pages, (written whilst a POW, the best narrative of Vincigliata as Campo PG12, contains a scale plan of Castello di Vincigliata, and photographs taken by the author just after the war)
 Williams, E. T. "Carton de Wiart, Sir Adrian (1880–1963)", rev. G. D. Sheffield, Oxford Dictionary of National Biography, Oxford University Press, 2004, . Online version retrieved on 6 February 2009.

External links

Location of grave and VC medal (Co. Cork)

British Army Officers 1939–1945 
Generals of World War II

|-

1880 births
1963 deaths
People educated at The Oratory School
Alumni of Balliol College, Oxford
Military personnel from Brussels
British Army personnel of the Second Boer War
British World War I recipients of the Victoria Cross
British Battle of the Somme recipients of the Victoria Cross
British amputees
British anti-communists
British Army generals of World War II
Polish generals
British Army cavalry generals of World War I
World War II prisoners of war held by Italy
British escapees
English Roman Catholics
Escapees from Italian detention
Companions of the Distinguished Service Order
Companions of the Order of the Bath
Companions of the Order of St Michael and St George
Knights Commander of the Order of the British Empire
Recipients of the Virtuti Militari
British World War II prisoners of war
4th Royal Irish Dragoon Guards officers
Imperial Light Horse officers
Somaliland Camel Corps officers
British Army recipients of the Victoria Cross
Belgian people of Irish descent
Belgian emigrants to the United Kingdom
Naturalised citizens of the United Kingdom
British expatriates in Poland
Military personnel from Cairo
British Army lieutenant generals